Chaetotheresia is a genus of bristle flies in the family Tachinidae. There is at least one described species in Chaetotheresia, C. crassa.

Distribution
Brazil

References

Dexiinae
Diptera of South America
Tachinidae genera
Taxa named by Charles Henry Tyler Townsend